Oscar Rivadeneira (born in 1960 in Lima, Peru) is a retired Peruvian boxer.

Rivadeneira fought with Michael Spinks in 1983 for the Undisputed Light Heavyweight championship. He was beaten in a tenth round knockout.

External links

Light-heavyweight boxers
Peruvian male boxers
Sportspeople from Lima
Living people
1960 births
Date of birth missing (living people)
20th-century Peruvian people